Cornerstone is a residential neighbourhood in the northeast quadrant of Calgary, Alberta, Canada. Located near the north edge of the city,  it is bounded by the  Skyview Ranch and Redstone communities to the west, Stoney Trail NE to the north, Calgary, Cityscape Community to the south, and Cornerstone Close Northeast Road to the east.

The Cornerstone Community is master-planned by Walton Development and Management.

Cornerstone is located within Calgary City Council's Ward 5.

In 2018, Walton Development and Management partnered with Anthem United to manage the development. The day-to-day duties were formally transferred as of March 28, 2018.

Demographics 
Occupied dwellings had an average of  residents per dwelling.

See also 
List of neighbourhoods in Calgary

References 

Neighbourhoods in Calgary